Dina Romano (born Geltrude Ricci; 16 February 1876 – 7 November 1957) was an Italian stage and film actress. She appeared in more than fifty films during her career including The Materassi Sisters (1944).

Selected filmography
 Aldebaran (1935)
 The Ancestor (1936)
 God's Will Be Done (1936)
 Adam's Tree (1936)
 But It's Nothing Serious (1936)
 The Three Wishes (1937)
 The Two Mothers (1938)
 A Thousand Lire a Month (1939)
 Marionette (1939)
 Saint John, the Beheaded (1940)
 First Love (1941)
 The Adventuress from the Floor Above (1941)
 The Brambilla Family Go on Holiday (1941)
 A Garibaldian in the Convent (1942)
 Fedora (1942)
 The Materassi Sisters (1944)
 The Two Orphans (1947)
 The Flame That Will Not Die (1949)
 Love and Blood (1951)
 Shadows Over Naples (1951)

References

Bibliography 
 Landy, Marcia. The Folklore of Consensus: Theatricality in the Italian Cinema, 1930-1943. SUNY Press, 1998.

External links 
 

1876 births
1957 deaths
Italian film actresses
People from Pistoia
20th-century Italian actresses